Fiona Glenanne is a fictional character in the television series Burn Notice (2007–2013), portrayed by Gabrielle Anwar. According to Fiona's biography from USA Network:

Fiona works with Michael Westen, Sam Axe and, starting in season 4, Jesse Porter, doing odd jobs, as well as working as an unlicensed bounty hunter and arms dealer. She is shown to be an explosives expert, marksman, and a precision driver.

Overview
Fiona first met Michael Westen when she was in Ireland with the IRA when he went undercover as Michael McBride. Despite their clashing personalities, the two eventually developed a romance, but it came to a sudden end when Michael left Fiona literally in the middle of the night, without a word because his cover was blown. Due to Michael not updating his emergency contact in years, Fiona picked up Michael in Miami after he was stranded there when he was burned because she was the only emergency contact, and she has since helped him numerous times in his various jobs. Now that she has encountered Michael again, Fiona makes efforts to pressure Michael into a more substantial relationship. Fiona also keeps in touch with Michael's mother, Madeline.

In the early part of season 2, Fiona starts dating a paramedic named Campbell, and whilst it is never admitted it is believed her main reason for dating him was to drive Michael crazy that she was no longer available. However the relationship ended when Campbell confronted Fiona about her lingering feelings for Michael, and she couldn't deny them.

In season 3, episode 8, Fiona has had enough of Michael and walks out. Refusing to appear at a monitoring job, she doesn't turn up for Michael for the first time in the series.  The reason was over Michael's choice to get back into the spy trade. In the season 3 summer finale, it is revealed that Fiona has five brothers, including an older one named Sean, and a younger sister named Claire, who was killed in The Troubles.

Fiona tends to shoot (or blow up) first and ask questions later. Her preferred method is going in with guns blazing or IEDs exploding, and Michael frequently has to hold her back. After spending time taking care of a child in season 1, Fiona becomes especially upset when someone abuses or endangers children.

Fiona also has a certain vixen complex, frequently using her sex appeal to acquire information.

Series creator Matt Nix has said about the characters' relationship: 

In the pilot episode, she spoke with an Irish accent; starting with "Identity", she has consistently spoken with an American accent as part of her effort to fit in with the Miami scene.

Relationships

Michael
Michael Westen is by far the most important person in Fiona's life. They met while Michael was working undercover as Michael McBride in Dublin, Ireland, at which time Fiona was robbing banks for the IRA. They began a tumultuous relationship, one which Michael described as being "profoundly unhappy". In spite of the sometimes violent nature of their union, Fiona fell deeply in love with him; and he would later confess that he loved her as well. Their relationship ended when Michael's cover was blown, and he was forced to leave in the middle of the night, without explanation.

They would later reconnect when Michael was dumped in Miami after he was "burned". Fiona immediately began trying to maneuver him into another relationship; and, though Michael makes efforts to keep her at arm's length, he reciprocates her feelings to a small degree.  Fiona struck up a friendship with his mother, and she occasionally uses this as a means of spending more time with him.  She also convinced Michael to give her a key to his apartment. They had sex in season 1 after Fiona initiated a physical sparring match with Michael to relieve her frustration with him, and they were both somewhat hesitant around each other the following morning. Whilst he did admit that he still cared for her, Michael was hesitant to restart their relationship.

In season 2, Fiona tried to distance herself from Michael after she realized that he was making her his second priority, behind his desire to discover who "burned" him. She becomes involved in a frivolous relationship with a paramedic named Campbell, which caused Michael some slight twinges of jealousy...though not as much as Fiona would have liked. At this time, Michael began to stop taking her for granted as much; and they experience some very emotionally charged moments. Campbell ends their relationship then informs her that Michael was her "real boyfriend". Fiona is also introduced to Samantha Kees, a professional thief and Michael former-fiancée: they got engaged before Michaels mission to Ireland. Michael admits that whilst He and Samantha were similar in personality (hence the ease of their relationship), he was much more involved in his relationship with Fiona, simply saying that Fiona "knew a part of me that [Samantha] never did.", and that Michael ended their engagement because he was in love with Fiona. Soon thereafter, Michael becomes half-crazed with panic and grief after believing that Fiona died in a house fire while investigating a lead for him. He arrived back at his apartment to find Fiona alive and well. His relief at seeing her unharmed is so great that he embraces her and kisses her.

In season 3, Fiona begins to grow disenchanted with Michael and his obsession with getting back into the spy game. She eventually becomes so fed up with him that she plans to return to Ireland. At that time, her brother Sean arrives to help her when she is targeted by an old nemesis from her past, a vicious explosives-maker named O'Neill who abducts Fiona and plans to return her to Europe to auction her off to some of her "old associates", who will certainly torture and kill her. When Michael and Sam stage a rescue, she is shot in the arm and leaps into the ocean, where she falls into unconsciousness. Michael pulls her out of the water and upon regaining her senses, she is forced to remain in Miami, as Michael's cover is blown and neither he nor she can ever safely return to Ireland. They have another sexual encounter at a hotel later in the season as Michaels way of apologising for not realising how important she is to him sooner.

In the season 4 finale, Fiona admits to Jesse that she loves Michael, for better or for worse, and would rather die with him than live without him.

Season 5 confirms that Michael and Fiona have officially restarted their relationship. Having not seen him in 6 months, Fiona viciously spars with him in his loft before engaging in rough sex. In season 5 episode 2, Michael told Fiona that he couldn't have completed many jobs without her and that he wants her to move in with him. He says, "It's a new job, not a new life. I like my life. And I want to live it with you, here."

In the season 5 finale, Michael told Fiona that when it comes to her there is no line that he would not cross. However, Fiona decides that she has had enough of Anson and that she cannot let him continue manipulating Michael and decides to turn herself in, and Michael watches in agony as the love of his life goes to jail. With Fiona in jail, this leaves Michael a chance so he can take down Anson, once and for all. Fiona is taken into custody for the deaths of the security guards in the British Consulate. In the first episode of season 6, she is interrogated by Agent Bly. He offers her a deal: give up Michael's involvement in the bombing in order to not face the electric chair.

In the season 6 episode "Shockwave", she is released from prison after signing Tom Card’s contract to become an official CIA asset. After Agent Pearce's reassignment to Mumbai, Agents Bailey and Manaro are requiring Fiona to fulfill the contractual obligation of her release or return to prison. Michael will not allow Fiona to do Bailey and Manaro's mission alone. After forcing Bailey and Manaro to trust in Fiona's skills, Michael provides the distraction needed to allow Fiona to finish the mission and thus manipulating Bailey and Manaro to "lose" Fiona's contract. As the team fights for a way out of Miami to save themselves, Fiona and Michael begin struggling to save their relationship. In Panama, Michael promised Fiona that when his name is clear, he is out of the agency. At the end of the season, the team is in a CIA prison. When they are released, Michael is giving orders to other agents. When Fiona confronts him, he states he did what needed to be done, but Fiona's response is he did what he wanted. She withdraws from Michael's reach in tears. He broke his promise.

In season 7 their relationship takes a turn for the worse. After nearly nine months of not seeing each other Fiona and Michael finally come face to face. After Fiona was kidnapped, Michael started remembering the time they met in Ireland. Michael arrives at the place where Fiona is being held captive, there he remembers that back in Ireland, Fi told him a story, she said that her father would tell her to be brave. Before hanging up on her Michael told Fiona: "It's time to be brave little Angel". After saving her life, she gave him a kiss on the cheek, the Irish way of breaking up. Fiona is later arrested where she learns that Michael saved her and the gang from going to jail. It is here where she realized she made a mistake, in breaking up with him and for doubting him. Carlos, Fiona's "new" boyfriend breaks up with her because he sees that Fiona still loves Michael and that he will always be the love of her life. In the penultimate episode "Sea Change" Fiona puts a tracker in Michael's gun and the team learns that Michael is about to betray the CIA, Jesse tells the team that Michael is not the same and that he is lost. Fiona tells the team that if they don't stop him, "there won't be a [Michael Westen] left to save". Fiona heads to the roof where Sonya threatens to kill her in front of Michael, a shot is heard and the screen goes black. In "Reckoning" after he shoots Sonya to save Fiona, Michael and Fiona escape the roof and are saved by Sam and Jesse. Michael goes to his mom's house and Madeline asks Michael if he is coming to Charlie's birthday party. Michael says he is not sure but Madeline tells Michael that Charlie wanted him there. Michael and Fiona are captured by James' men and Madeline tells Michael that she has to make the ultimate sacrifice saying, "Sometimes sacrifices have to be made." Michael and Fiona come out to confront James and Michael tells him that Fiona is going to negotiate. Fiona asks "should we shoot them?". A battle of guns ensues and Michael tells Fiona he wants to live more than he ever has. Apparently Michael and Fiona die in the explosion. It is later shown through flashbacks that they survived. After Sam wishes luck on Michael, Jesse and Sam leave. The next scene shows what appears to be a cottage in Ireland. Fiona is seen getting hot chocolate and Charlie is asleep in Michael's lap. Michael asks Fiona what he will tell Charlie when he is older. Fiona asks about what and Michael tells her "about me" Fiona tells him to tell Charlie the truth. Michael asks where would he start and Fiona tells him "start from the beginning. Start with 'my name is Michael Westen, I used to be a spy". Michael smiles, and he and Fiona kiss, Fiona raising Charlie as if he was her own and living happily ever after in Ireland.

Sam
At some point in the past, Sam Axe foiled an attempt by Fiona to sell a large shipment of weapons to a Libyan arms dealer, costing her a considerable sum of money. Upon being reacquainted with him in Miami, she was at first (understandably) very hostile towards him, often making disparaging remarks about him and belittling him for being under the thumb of the Feds. After working together on several jobs, she began to mellow towards Sam and even admitted that she admired the loyalty that he displayed for his friends. Sam has been known to ask Fiona for advice regarding his relationships with women.

Though she and Sam will occasionally be rivals for Michael's attention, there is no real hostility between them anymore; and they now share a committed, if antagonistic, friendship. Though neither likes to admit it, they work well as a team, as Michael has pointed out. They have also demonstrated a willingness to risk life and limb for one another, as Fiona helped Michael rescue Sam from a vicious drug lord at the end of Season 1; and Sam likewise helped Michael save Fiona from O'Neill's clutches. Sam confessed that he felt sad when he thought Fiona would be returning to Ireland. The two of them will still trade barbs, though their verbal sparring now takes the form of playful teasing.

Jesse Porter
In Season 4, Jesse Porter joins the team after being inadvertently burned by Michael. Fiona initially admires Jesse's flair for action and sense of personal morality. While not (at first) interested romantically, the two have begun to form a sibling bond. They have covered Michael's operations as a sniper-and-spotter-team and heavily modified a Ford pickup to carry heavy weapons only to take it out on a joy ride through Miami. The two took a working vacation together in the Bahamas and posed as a married couple, which cemented their professional relationship and built up Fiona's trust in Jesse. Because of Jesse's troubles in turning a blind eye toward people in trouble (even if the mission is in jeopardy), and his quick reactions in using violent force, the two often pair off to play devil's advocate with Michael's plans, which has forced him to become more open about his rationales.

Fiona is torn between her loyalty to Michael and her hatred of the lies they are telling Jesse. There appears to be sexual tension whenever Fiona and Jesse are alone together. In the mid-season finale, the two share a lengthy kiss to cover their motives when they are discovered in her car spying on a shady legal team. She later tells Michael that she has definitely been feeling something for Jesse and that, despite the kiss being a ruse, there was real passion in it.

After Jesse finds out that Michael was the one who burned him, he confronts Fiona at Michael's place. Although hurt and disappointed finding out his friends burned and lied to him, it hurt him the most knowing that Fiona was in on it, since they were very close and he had feelings for her. Although he threatened to kill her, he couldn't bring himself to do it, and leaves instead. It leaves Fiona very heartbroken, knowing she hurt Jesse, who she grew to really care about. In the summer season 4 finale, she and Madeline try to mend things with Jesse, apologizing to him and ask him to help the team out in taking out Barrett.

When Michael is recovering in hospital afterwards, Fiona calls Jesse and together with Sam they explain everything that has happened with him, including giving him Michaels dossier with all of the crimes he's accused of. Fiona later calls Jesse to a meeting at a bar, which was part of Madeleine plan to force Michael and Jesse to stop being stubborn with each other and make friends again, which evidently worked.

References

Burn Notice characters
Fictional bounty hunters
Fictional Irish people
Fictional women soldiers and warriors
Television characters introduced in 2007
Fictional immigrants to the United States

ja:バーン・ノーティス 元スパイの逆襲#登場人物